Taibao (Hokkien POJ: Thài-pó) is a county-administered city and the county seat of Chiayi County, Taiwan.

Name
The city was named after the government position of Wang De-lu, whose hometown is Taibao, in the 19th century.

History
Formerly Tsing-kau-boe.

Taibao City was established as Taibao Township in August 1945 after the World War II. In August 1946, Taibao Township was incorporated to Chiayi City to become Taibao District. In September 1950, it became a rural township named Taibao Township under Chiayi County administration. In July 1991, it became a county-administered city called Taibao City.

Administrative divisions
The city has 18 villages, which are Beixin, Nanxin, Bixiang, Maliao, Guogou, Gangwei, Tianwei, Jiubi, Xinpi, Qiantan, Houtan, Meipu, Houzhuang, Taibao, Dongshi, Lunding, Chunzhu and Anren Village.

Government institutions

 Chiayi County Government

Education
 Tatung Institute of Commerce and Technology

Tourist attractions

 Chiayi County Baseball Stadium and Chiayi County Track Stadium
 National Palace Museum Southern Branch
 Ox General Temple
 Ping Huang Coffee Museum
 Wangshihjia Temple

Transportation

Rail

The city is served by Chiayi Station of the Taiwan High Speed Rail.

Bus
Chiayi Bus Rapid Transit connects the city with neighboring Chiayi City.

Notable natives
 Wang De-lu, Qing Dynasty general
 Yeh Hsien-hsiu, politician and singer

References

External links

 Taibao City Office, Chiayi County

1991 establishments in Taiwan
County-administered cities of Taiwan
Populated places in Chiayi County